Most of the territory of what is now the Republic of Serbia was part of the Ottoman Empire throughout the Early Modern period, especially Central Serbia and Southern Serbia, unlike Vojvodina which had passed to Habsburg rule starting from the end of the 17th century (with several takeovers of Central Serbia as well).

In the 14th and 15th centuries, the Serbian Despotate was conquered by the Ottoman Empire as part of the Ottoman conquest of the Balkans. The Ottomans defeated the Serbs at the Battle of Maritsa in 1371, making vassals of the southern governors. Soon thereafter, Serbian Emperor Stefan Uroš V died; as he was childless and the nobility could not agree on the rightful heir, the Empire was subsequently ruled by semi-independent provincial lords, who often were in feuds with each other. The most powerful of these, Lazar of Serbia, the Duke of a region now encompassing present-day central Serbia, that had not yet fallen under Ottoman rule, confronted the Ottomans at the Battle of Kosovo in 1389. The outcome of the battle was the mutual annihilation of both armies, but Serbia did eventually fall to the Ottomans. Stefan Lazarević, the son of Lazar, succeeded him as ruler, but had by 1394 become an Ottoman vassal. In 1402 he renounced Ottoman rule and became an ally of Hungary, and the years that followed were characterized by the Ottomans and Hungary battling over the territory of Serbia. In 1453, the Ottomans conquered Constantinople, and in 1458 Athens was taken. In 1459, Serbia was annexed, followed by Greece a year later.

Several minor, unsuccessful and short-lived revolts were conducted against Ottoman rule mostly with the help of the Habsburgs; 1594, 1688–1691, 1718–1739 and 1788. In 1799, the dahia (janissary leaders, high-status infantry in the provinces) took over the Sanjak of Smederevo, renouncing the Sultan and imposing higher taxes. In 1804, they murdered the most notable intellectuals and nobles, known as the Slaughter of the Dukes. In retaliation, the Serbs took arms and had by 1806 killed or driven out all of the dahia, but the fight did not stop; when the Sultan were to send the new Pasha into the province, the Serbs killed him. The revolt continued, in what would be known as the First Serbian Uprising, with the Serbs under Karageorge defeating the Turks in several battles, liberating most of central Serbia; a fully working government was established. In 1813, Serbs suffered a huge defeat, an unsuccessful rebellion followed in 1814, and in 1815 the Second Serbian Uprising began. In 1817, Serbia was de facto independent (as Principality of Serbia).

The article deals with the history, culture and structure of Serbs in the Ottoman Empire.

History

Wars for Serbia (1389–1540)

The Turks defeated the Serbian army in one crucial battle: on the banks of the river Maritsa in 1371, where the forces of Vukašin and Jovan Uglješa Mrnjavčević from today's North Macedonia were defeated, destroying any hope for a reunified Serbian Empire. From then on, the Serbian state was on the defensive, and this war culminated in the Battle of Kosovo in 1389. This battle pitted Lazar of Serbia, Vuk Branković, and Vlatko Vuković against the best troops of Sultan Murad I. Both Sultan Murad I and Prince Lazar lost their lives in this inconclusive bloodbath.

The Battle of Kosovo defined the long-term fate of Serbia, because now it had no force capable of standing up to the Turks directly. This was an unstable period marked by the rule of Prince Lazar's son — despot Stefan Lazarević — a true European-style knight, a military leader, and a poet. Stefan was at first a vassal of Sultan Bayezid I, distinguishing himself at the Battle of Nicopolis in 1396 and at Ankara in 1402, later gaining independence after the loss of Bayezid. His cousin and heir Đurađ Branković moved the capital to the newly built fortified town of Smederevo. The Turks continued their conquest until they finally seized all of northern Serbian territory in 1459 when Smederevo fell into their hands. The only free Serbian territories were parts of Bosnia and Zeta. After the fall of Principality of Zeta in 1496, Serbia was ruled by the Ottoman Empire for almost three centuries. A Serbian principality under Hungarian protection was created, after the fall of the Serbian Despotate, by the Branković family (later other Serbian noblemen assumed the throne) in what is now Vojvodina, Slavonia, and Bosnia. The subordinate state spent its entirety fighting the Ottomans and represented the heritage of what was left of the Serbian Kingdom. It fell in 1540 when the Ottoman conquest of the Serbian lands, which lasted through about 200 years of continuous warfare, was finally complete.

Hungary and Serbia (1389–1540) 

From the 14th century onward an increasing number of Serbs began migrating north to the region today known as Vojvodina, which was then under the rule of the Kingdom of Hungary. The Hungarian kings encouraged the immigration of Serbs to the kingdom, and hired many of them as soldiers and border guards. Therefore, the Serb population of this region highly increased. During the struggle between the Ottoman Empire and Hungary, this Serb population attempted a restoration of the Serbian state. In the battle of Mohač on August 29, 1526, Ottoman Turkey destroyed the army of the Hungarian–Bohemian king Louis Jagellion, who was killed on the battlefield. After this battle Hungary broke up into three parts, and much of its former territory became part of the Ottoman Empire. Soon after the Battle of Mohač the leader of Serbian mercenaries in Hungary, Jovan Nenad "The Black", established his rule in Bačka, northern Banat, and a small part of Srem (These three regions are now parts of Vojvodina). He created an independent state, with the city of Subotica as its capital. At the peak of his power Jovan Nenad crowned himself in Subotica as the Serb emperor. Taking advantage of the extremely confused military and political situation, the Hungarian noblemen from the region joined forces against him and defeated the Serbian troops in the summer of 1527. Emperor Jovan Nenad was assassinated and his state collapsed.

After the Siege of Belgrade, Suleiman I settled Serbs in the nearby Forest of Constantinople, present day Bahçeköy, called Belgrade forest.

Austria and Serbia 

European powers, and Austria in particular, fought many wars against the Ottoman Empire, relying on the help of the Serbs who lived under Ottoman rule. During the Austro-Turkish War (1593–1606), in 1594, the Serbs staged an uprising in Banat, the Pannonian part of Turkey. Sinan Pasha retaliated by burning the remains of Saint Sava, the most sacred Serbian saint. Serbs created another center of resistance in Herzegovina, but when peace was signed by Turkey and Austria, they were abandoned to Turkish retaliation. This sequence of events became usual in the centuries that followed.

The Great War between Ottomans and the Holy League 

The Great War between Ottomans and the Holy League took place from 1683 to 1699.  The Holy League was created with the sponsorship of the Pope and included Austria, Poland and Venice. These three powers incited the Serbs to rebel against the Ottoman authorities, and soon uprisings and guerrilla warfare spread throughout the western Balkans, ranging from Montenegro and the Dalmatian coast to the Danube basin and Old Serbia (Macedonia, Raška, Kosovo and Metohija). However, when the Austrians started to pull out of Serbia, they invited the Serbian people to come north with them to the Austrian territories. Having to choose between Ottoman reprisal and living in a Christian state, Serbs abandoned their homesteads and headed north led by patriarch Arsenije Čarnojević.

Austrian-Ottoman War 

Another important episode in Serbian history took place in 1716–1718, when the Serbian ethnic territories, ranging from Dalmatia, Bosnia and Herzegovina, to Belgrade and the Danube basin, became the battleground for a new Austrian-Ottoman war launched by Prince Eugene of Savoy. The Serbs sided once again with Austria. After a peace treaty was signed in Požarevac, Ottomans lost all possessions in the Danube basin, as well as northern Serbia, northern Bosnia, and parts of Dalmatia and the Peloponnesus.

The last Austrian-Ottoman war was known as the Dubica War (1788–1791), when the Austrians urged the Christians in Bosnia to rebel. No wars were fought afterwards until the 20th century, which marked the fall of both mighty empires (by this time, Austria had become Austria-Hungary).

Revolts

Banat Uprising (1594)

In the Banat region, which then formed part of the Ottoman Eyalet of Temeşvar, in the area around Vršac, a large uprising began against the Ottoman Empire in 1594. It was the largest uprising of Serbian people against Ottoman rule till date. The leader of this uprising was Teodor Nestorović, the Bishop of Vršac. Other leaders were Sava Ban and voivode Velja Mironić.

For a short time, the Serb rebels captured several cities in Banat, including Vršac, Bečkerek, and Lipova, as well as Titel and Bečej in Bačka. The size of this uprising is illustrated by the verse from one Serbian national song: "Sva se butum zemlja pobunila, Šest stotina podiglo se sela, Svak na cara pušku podigao!" ("The whole land has rebelled, six hundred villages arose, everybody pointed his gun against the emperor"). The rebellion had the character of a holy war, the Serb rebels carrying flags with the image of Saint Sava. Sinan Pasha, who led the Ottoman army, ordered the green flag of Muhammad brought from Damascus to counter the Serbian flag, and burned the mortal remains of Saint Sava in Belgrade.

Eventually, the uprising was crushed, and most of the Serbs from this region, fearing Ottoman retaliation, fled to Transylvania, leaving the Banat region deserted.

Serb Uprising of 1596–97

The Serb Uprising of 1596-97 was organized by Patriarch Jovan Kantul and led by Grdan.

Planned revolts with Russian aid
Serbian-Russian Sava Vladislavich maintained trade contacts with fellow Serbs and was under the impression that they would rise in revolt against the Sultan as soon as the Tsar invaded the Danubian Principalities. Having launched the invasion in 1711, Tsar Peter sent him on a mission to Moldavia and Montenegro, whose population Vladislavich was expected to incite to rebellion. Little came of these plans, despite the assistance of a pro-Russian colonel, Michael Miloradovich (the ancestor of Count Miloradovich). There has been preserved an inscription from that time, in a chronicle:
In the year 1711 Mihailo Miloradovich came to Montenegro, to the great misfortune of the Monastery and of Montenegro.... [for Vizir Kiuprili in 1714] razed Montenegro and destroyed the church and the Monastery.

Petar I Petrović-Njegoš, the Prince-Bishop of Montenegro (Serbian Orthodox Episcop of Cetinje), conceived a plan to form a new Serbian Empire out of Bosnia, Serbia, Herzegovina and Montenegro with Boka, with Dubrovnik as its Imperial Capital. In 1807, he sent a letter to the Russian General of the Danube Army regarding this subject: "The Russian Czar would be recognized as the Tsar of the Serbs and the Metropolitan of Montenegro would be his assistant. The leading role in the restoration of the Serbian Empire belongs to Montenegro."

Habsburg takeovers (1686–91); (1718–1739); (1788–1793)

From 1718 until 1739 the country was known as Kingdom of Serbia (1718–1739). The fall of Habsburg Serbia was followed by the Great Migrations of the Serbs from the Ottoman Empire into the Austrian Empire.

In the latter half of the century, officer Koča Anđelković led a successful rebellion against the Ottomans with the help of Austria and again placed Serbia under the rule of the Habsburgs, the territory was known as Koča's frontier. It ended with the Treaty of Sistova and the withdrawal of Austrians.

Tekelija's aim
Sava Tekelija, Serbian nobleman, doctor of law and patron of arts, had a significant role in the cultural life of Serbs in the Habsburg monarchy, as well as the overall political life of the realm. In the Timisioara meeting in 1790, he made a famous speech pleading for the legal inclusion of Serbian privileges. He supported his standpoint with thorough analysis of privileges using legal arguments, stating that the law presented a higher authority than the will of individuals, rulers; thus the privileges would be better protected if included in the Hungarian laws. At the time of the First Uprising, he made the map of the Serbian lands, which acted as a political programme. He sent letters to Napoleon, proposing the establishment of a South Slavic political unit, with Serbia as core, including the parts conquered by France – from which the Illyrian provinces would be formed. To achieve the goal of this political unit, he proposed that France help the Serbian Revolution, because it would prevent the Russian penetration and influence in these territories. He sent a similar letter to Austrian Emperor Francis I in 1805 proposing other political alliances, also with the goal of preventing Russian influence. His project implied an establishment of a Serbian state, or more generally, a South Slavic state. His works show his view of the potential future of the South Slavic nations.

1791–1804

The withdrawal of the Austrians from Serbia in 1791 marked the end of the Kočina Krajina Serb rebellion, which had been ignited by Austria in 1788. However Austria needed to settle the war, and returned the Belgrade region to the Ottoman Empire.  Despite guarantees that Austria had insisted on, many of the participants in the uprising and their families went into exile in Austria. Reforms made by the Porte to ease the pressure on Serbs were only temporary; by 1799 the Janissary corps had returned, suspended Serb autonomy and drastically increased taxes, enforcing martial law in Serbia.

Serb leaders from both sides of the Danube began to conspire against the dahias. When they found out, they rounded up and murdered dozens of Serbian noblemen on the main square of Valjevo in an event known today as Seča knezova (Slaughter of the Dukes in 1804).

The massacre outraged the Serbian people and incited the revolt across the Pashaluk of Belgrade. Within days, in the small Šumadija village of Orašac, the Serbs gathered to proclaim the uprising, electing Karađorđe Petrović as the leader. That afternoon, a Turkish inn (caravanserai) in Orašac was burned and its residents fled or were killed, followed by similar actions country-wide. Soon the cities Valjevo and Požarevac were liberated, and the siege of Belgrade launched.

Initially fighting to restore their local privileges within the Ottoman system (until 1807), the revolutionaries – supported by the wealthy Serbian community from the southern Austrian Empire (present-day Vojvodina) and Serb officers from the Austrian Military Frontier – offered themselves to be placed under the protection of Habsburg-, Russian- and French Empires respectively, entering, as a new political factor, into the converging aspirations of the Great Powers during the Napoleonic wars in Europe.

First Serbian Uprising

During the almost 10 years of the First Serbian Uprising (1804–1813), Serbia perceived itself as an independent state for the first time, after 300 years of the Ottoman and short-lasting Austrian occupations. 
Encouraged by the Russian Empire, the demands for self-government within the Ottoman Empire in 1804 developed into a war for independence by 1807. Combining patriarchal peasant democracy with modern national goals, the Serbian revolution was attracting thousands of volunteers among the Serbs from across the Balkans and Central Europe. The Serbian Revolution ultimately became a symbol of the nation-building process in the Balkans, provoking peasant unrest among the Christians in both Greece and Bulgaria.
Following the successful siege with 25,000 men, on 8 January 1807 the charismatic leader of the revolt Karađorđe Petrović proclaimed Belgrade the capital of Serbia.

Serbs responded to the Ottoman brutalities by establishing its separate institutions: Governing Council (Praviteljstvujušči Sovjet), the Great Academy (Velika škola), the Theological Academy (Bogoslovija) and other administrative bodies. Karađorđe and other revolutionary leaders sent their children to the Great Academy, which had among its students also Vuk Stefanović Karadžić (1787–1864), the famous reformer of the Serbian alphabet. Belgrade was repopulated by local military leaders, merchants and craftsmen, but also by an important group of enlightened Serbs from the Habsburg Empire who gave a new cultural and political framework to the egalitarian peasant society of Serbia. Dositej Obradović, a prominent figure of the Balkan Enlightenment, the founder of the Great Academy, became the first Ministry of Education in modern Serbia in 1811.

Following the French invasion in 1812 the Russian Empire withdrew its support for the Serb rebels. Unwilling to accept anything less than independence, the revolutionaries were fought into submission following the Ottoman incursion into Serbia. One quarter of Serbia's population (at that moment around 100,000 people) were exiled into the Habsburg Empire, including the leader of the Uprising, Karađorđe Petrović. Recaptured by the Ottomans in October 1813, Belgrade became a scene of brutal revenge, with hundreds of its citizens massacred, and thousands sold into slavery as far as Asia. Direct Ottoman rule also meant the abolition of all Serbian institutions, including Velika škola and the return of Ottoman Turks to Serbia.

Hadži-Prodan's Revolt (1814)

Despite the lost battle, the tensions nevertheless persisted. In 1814 an unsuccessful Hadži Prodan's revolt was launched by Hadži Prodan Gligorijević, one of the veterans of the First Serbian Uprising. He knew the Turks would arrest him, so he thought it best to resist the Ottomans; Milos Obrenović, another veteran, felt the time was not right for an uprising and did not provide assistance.

Hadži Prodan's Uprising soon failed and he fled to Austria. After a riot at a Turkish estate in 1814, the Turkish authorities massacred the local population and publicly impaled 200 prisoners at Belgrade. By March 1815, Serbs had held several meetings and decided upon a new revolt.

Second Serbian Uprising

The Second Serbian Uprising (1815–1817) was a second phase of the national revolution of the Serbs against the Ottoman Empire, which erupted shortly after the brutal annexation of the country to the Ottoman Empire and the failed Hadži Prodan's revolt. The revolutionary council proclaimed an uprising in Takovo on April 23, 1815, with Milos Obrenović chosen as the leader (while Karađorđe was still in exile in Austria). 
The decision of the Serb leaders was based on two reasons. First, they feared a general massacre of knezes. Second, they learned that Karađorđe was planning to return from exile in Russia. The anti-Karađorđe faction, including Miloš Obrenović, was anxious to forestall Karađorđe and keep him out of power.

Fighting resumed at Easter in 1815, and Milos became the supreme leader of the new revolt. When the Ottomans discovered this they sentenced all of its leaders to death. The Serbs fought in battles at Ljubić, Čačak, Palez, Požarevac and Dublje and managed to reconquer the Pashaluk of Belgrade.
Milos advocated a policy of restraint: captured Ottoman soldiers were not killed and civilians were released. His announced goal was not independence but to put an end to abusive misrule.

Wider European events now helped the Serbian cause. Political and diplomatic means in negotiations between the Prince of Serbia and the Ottoman Porte, instead of further war clashes coincided with the political rules within the framework of Metternich's Europe. Prince Miloš Obrenović, an astute politician and able diplomat, in order to confirm his hard-won loyalty to the Porte in 1817 ordered the assassination of Karađorđe Petrović. The final defeat of Napoleon in 1815 raised Turkish fears that Russia might again intervene in the Balkans. To avoid this the sultan agreed to make Serbia suzerain – a semi-independent state nominally responsible to the Porte.

Ottoman Serbs

Ottoman Serbs, who were Serbian Orthodox Christian, belonged to the Rum Millet (millet-i Rûm, "Roman Nation"). Although a separate Serbian millet (Sırp Milleti) was not officially recognized during Ottoman rule, the Serbian Church was the legally confirmed representative organization of the Serbs in the Ottoman Empire.

See also

Serbia in the Middle Ages
Byzantine Serbia

References

Sources

 
 
 
 
 
 
 
  [missing link]
 
 
 
 
 
 Zirojević, O. (1974) Tursko vojno uređenje u Srbiji, 1459–1683. Beograd: Istorijski institut

 
Islam in Serbia
15th-century establishments in Serbia
1912 disestablishments in Serbia
Serbia
Serbia
States and territories established in 1459
States and territories disestablished in 1912
Occupation of Serbia